Ramsey Creek is a stream in the U.S. state of Iowa. It is a tributary to the English River.

It is unknown why the name "Ramsey Creek" was applied to this stream.

References

Rivers of Johnson County, Iowa
Rivers of Washington County, Iowa
Rivers of Iowa